Thanakkankulam is a neighbourhood in Madurai district of Tamil Nadu state in the peninsular India.

Thanakkankulam area falls under the Thiruparankundram Assembly constituency. The winner of the election held in the year 2021 as the member of its assembly constituency is V. V. Rajan Chellappa. Also, this area belongs to Virudhunagar Lok Sabha constituency. The winner of the election held in the year 2019, as the member of its Lok Sabha constituency is B. Manickam Tagore.

References 

Neighbourhoods and suburbs of Madurai